Michele Cristina das Chagas (born 15 July 1987) is a Brazilian long-distance runner. She competed in the marathon event at the 2015 World Championships in Athletics in Beijing, China.

See also
 Brazil at the 2015 World Championships in Athletics

References

1987 births
Living people
Brazilian female long-distance runners
Place of birth missing (living people)
World Athletics Championships athletes for Brazil